Italy competed at the 1959 Mediterranean Games in Beirut, Lebanon.

Italy, at this edition of the Games, had not participated in the athletics competitions.

Medals

See also
 Boxing at the 1959 Mediterranean Games
 Volleyball at the 1959 Mediterranean Games

References

External links
Mediterranean Games Athletic results at Gbrathletics.com

Nations at the 1959 Mediterranean Games
1959
Mediterranean Games